Nowshar or Nowsher, also rendered as Noshar, may refer to:
 Nowshar, Astaneh-ye Ashrafiyeh
 Nowshar, Lahijan
 Nowsher, Rasht
 Nowsher-e Koshk-e Bijar Rural District, in Rasht County

See also
 Noshahr (disambiguation)